Mohsen Hosseini (born February 9, 1985) is Sowme'eh Sara an Iranian football defender who plays for Gostaresh Foulad in the Persian Gulf Pro League.

References

Iranian footballers
Tractor S.C. players
Gostaresh Foulad F.C. players
1985 births
Sportspeople from Tehran
Living people
Nassaji Mazandaran players
Association football defenders